Calliphylloceras is an ammonite belonging to the Phylloceratidae.

Species
Species within this genus include:
 Calliphylloceras alontinum (Gemmellaro, 1884)
 Calliphylloceras bicicolae
 Calliphylloceras capitanii
 Calliphylloceras demidoffi (Rousseau, 1842)
 Calliphylloceras disputabile (type) Spath, 1927
 Calliphylloceras freibrocki Imlay, 1953
 Calliphylloceras kochi (Oppel, 1865)
 Calliphylloceras nilssoni
 Calliphylloceras nizinanum
 Calliphylloceras propinquum
 Calliphylloceras seroplicatum
 Calliphylloceras spadae
 Calliphylloceras supraliasicum

The holotype of C disputabile, the type species, named by Spath in 1927, which came from the Middle Jurassic of Hungary, is based on Phylloceras disputabile Zittil.  Neocalliphylloceras Bresairie 1936, Captianioceras Kuvacs 1939 and Euphylloceras Draughtchitz 1953 are equivalent genera.

Description

Calliphylloceras has a smooth, compressed involute shell with a rounded venter and periodic constrictions in the internal mold; surface covered with lirae as in Phylloceras. The first and 2nd lateral saddles are usually triphyllic, others diphyllic.

Distribution
This species has been found in the  Cretaceous of Bulgaria, Canada, France, Japan, United States and in the Jurassic of Argentina, Austria, Germany, Hungary, India, Iran, Italy, Japan, Madagascar, the Russian Federation, Spain, Turkey, United States

Bibliography
 Imlay 1960. Early Cretaceous (albian) Ammonites from the Chitina Valley and Talkeetna Mountains, Alaska. US Geological Survey PP 354-D

References
Notes

Jurassic ammonites
Cretaceous ammonites
Ammonites of Europe
Hettangian genus first appearances
Albian genus extinctions
Fossil taxa described in 1927
Phylloceratina